Every team has to submit a roster of 16 players. On 12 December 2013 an official squad list was published.

Group A

Austria
Head coach:  Patrekur Jóhannesson

A 14-player squad was announced on 27 December 2013, while a 20-player roster was published on 31 December 2013. An 18-player squad was announced on 8 January 2014.

Czech Republic
Head coach: Vladimír Haber

The squad was announced on 28 December 2013.

Denmark
Head coach: Ulrik Wilbek

An 18-player squad was announced on 9 December 2013. The final roster was published on 10 January 2014.

Macedonia
Head coach:  Ivica Obrvan

Group B

Hungary
Head coach: Lajos Mocsai

A 22-player squad was announced on 20 December 2013.

Iceland
Head coach: Aron Kristjánsson

A 21-player squad was announced on 17 December 2013. The squad was announced on 9 January 2014.

Norway
Head coach:  Robert Hedin

An 18-player squad was announced on 11 December 2013.

Spain
Head coach: Manolo Cadenas

The squad was announced on 11 December 2013.

Group C

France
Head coach: Claude Onesta

A 20-player squad was announced on 11 December 2013. The squad was announced on 8 January 2014.

Poland
Head coach:  Michael Biegler

An 18-player squad was announced on 2 January 2014, while the squad was published on 10 January 2014.

Russia
Head coach: Oleg Kuleshov

The squad was announced on 25 December 2013.

Serbia
Head coach: Vladan Matić

A 19-squad was announced on 31 December 2013.

Group D

Belarus
Head coach: Yuri Shevtsov

The squad was announced on 26 December 2013.

Croatia
Head coach: Slavko Goluža

An 18-player squad was announced on 10 January 2014.

Montenegro
Head coach: Zoran Kastratović

A 22-player squad was announced on 13 December 2013.

Sweden
Head coach: Staffan Olsson / Ola Lindgren

The squad was announced on 10 December 2013.

Statistics

Player representation by league system
In all, World Cup squad members play for clubs in 23 different countries.

Nations in italics are not represented by their national teams in the finals.
French squad have only two player employed by a non-domestic club; that players are employed in Spain. Only Icelandic squad is made up entirely of players employed by overseas clubs; although one player on that squad. Of the countries not represented by a national team at the World Cup, Handball-Bundesliga provides the most squad members.

Player representation by club
Clubs with 10 or more players represented are listed.

Coaches representation by country
Coaches in bold represent their own country.

References

External links
Official Website

2014 European Men's Handball Championship
European Handball Championship squads